Van Nevel is a surname. Notable people with the surname include:

Erik Van Nevel (born 1956), Belgian singer and conductor, nephew of Paul
Paul Van Nevel (born 1946), Belgian conductor, musicologist, and art historian

See also
Nevel (disambiguation)

Surnames of Dutch origin